is a Japanese voice actress. Her major roles include title character Momoko Hanasaki in the anime Wedding Peach, Hikaru Usada / Rabi~en~Rose in Di Gi Charat, Hebi no Yuki (Snake) in Angel Tales, Tsubaki Takamura in Sakura Wars, Urara Kasuga in Sakura Diaries. Recent roles include Sakagami-sensei in Love Lab and Yuki Sakurakōji in Code:Breaker. She is part of the voice actress trio Furil which also consists of Wedding Peach voice castmates Yūko Miyamura and Yukana.

Filmography

Anime

Films

Video games

Dubbing

Audio dramas

References

External links
 Official agency profile 
 

1969 births
Living people
Voice actresses from Hyōgo Prefecture
People from Takarazuka, Hyōgo
Japanese video game actresses
Japanese voice actresses
20th-century Japanese actresses
21st-century Japanese actresses
Mausu Promotion voice actors